This is a list of drama films of the 2000s.

2000
 28 Days
 Adanggaman
 Aberdeen
 Ali Zaoua: Prince of the Streets
 Almost Famous
 Before Night Falls
 Blackboards
 Cast Away
 The Circle
 Dancer in the Dark
 The Day I Became a Woman
 Dinosaur
 Faithless
 George Washington
 The Girl
 Hamlet
 In Vanda's Room
 Our Lady of the Assassins
 Our Song
 Pollock
 Remember the Titans
 Requiem for a Dream
 Road Home
 The Sea
 Taboo
 Traffic
 Under the Sand
 Water Drops on Burning Rocks
 Where the Heart Is
 Yi Yi
 You Can Count on Me

2001
 A.I. Artificial Intelligence
 All About Lily Chou-Chou
 A Beautiful Mind
 Dog Days
 Fat Girl
 Ghost World
 In the Bedroom
 In Praise of Love
 The Last Castle
 Kandahar
 Lagaan
 Lantana
 Maangamizi: The Ancient One
 The Man Who Wasn't There
 Millennium Actress
 Millennium Mambo
 Monsoon Wedding
 Monster's Ball
 Mulholland Drive
 Nowhere in Africa
 The Others
 The Son's Room
 Stranger Inside
 Time Out

2002
 8 Mile
 About Schmidt
 AKA
 All or Nothing
 Amen.
 Aro Tolbukhin. En la mente del asesino
 The Best Day of My Life
 Better Luck Tomorrow
 Bloody Sunday
 Catch Me If You Can
 City of God
 Company
 Crossroads 
 Distant
 Divine Secrets of the Ya-Ya Sisterhood
 Far from Heaven
 Frida
 Gangs of New York
 The Honeytrap
 The Hours
 The Laramie Project
 Last Call
 Lilya 4-ever
 The Loser Takes It All
 Madame Satã
 The Magdalene Sisters
 The Pianist
 The Quiet American
 Rabbit-Proof Fence
 Road to Perdition
 The Son
 Springtime in a Small Town
 Talk to Her
 Ten
 Unfaithful
 Waiting for Happiness
 Whale Rider

2003
 11:14
 16 Years of Alcohol
 21 Grams
 At Five in the Afternoon
 BAADASSSSS!
 Best of Youth
 Big Fish
 Cold Creek Manor
 Cold Mountain
 Crimson Gold
 Le Divorce
 Dogville
 The Five Obstructions
 Garden of Heaven
 House of Sand and Fog
 How to Deal
 Hulk
 The Human Stain
 In America
 The Last Samurai
 The Life of David Gale
 Lost in Translation
 Maria Full of Grace
 Master and Commander: The Far Side of the World
 Memories of Murder
 Mona Lisa Smile
 Monster
 The Motorcycle Diaries
 My Life Without Me
 Mystic River
 Osama
 Party Monster
 Radio
 The Return
 The Room
 Rosenstrasse
 Saraband
 Seabiscuit
 Shattered Glass
 Son frère
 Spring, Summer, Fall, Winter ...And Spring
 Sylvia
 Tears of the Sun
 Thirteen
 Till There Was You

2004
 18-J
 5x2
 69
 Anatomy of Hell
 The Aviator
 Bad Education
 Being Julia
 Black Friday
 Brothers
 Closer
 Finding Neverland
 Flying Boys
 Forty Shades of Blue
 Garden State
 Gilles' Wife
 Head-On
 The Holy Girl
 Hotel Rwanda
 House of Flying Daggers
 Innocence
 L'Intrus
 Keane
 Kinsey
 Maria Full of Grace
 Mean Creek
 Million Dollar Baby
 Moolaadé
 My Summer of Love
 Mysterious Skin
 Nine Lives
 Nobody Knows
 The Notebook
 The Passion of the Christ
 Raising Helen
 Ray
 The Sea Inside
 Souli
 Tony Takitani
 Turtles Can Fly
 Vera Drake
 A Very Long Engagement
 Wild Side
 Winter Solstice
 You Got Served

2005
 3 Needles
 A Lot Like Love
 À travers la forêt
 Alice
 Arashi no Yoru ni
 Brokeback Mountain
 Broken Flowers
 Capote
 The Child
 Cinderella Man
 The Constant Gardener
 Crash
 The Death of Mr. Lazarescu
 Empire Falls
 Fateless
 Good Night, and Good Luck
 Green Street Hooligans
 Hidden
 Hustle & Flow
 Jarhead
 Junebug
 Lackawanna Blues
 Lady Vengeance
 Manderlay
 Match Point
 Memoirs of a Geisha
 Mother of Mine
 Munich
 Mysterious Skin
 Nana
 Nicky's Game
 North Country
 Oliver Twist
 Paradise Now
 Shopgirl
 Sometimes in April
 Sophie Scholl: The Final Days
 The Squid and the Whale
 Syriana
 Transamerica
 Walk the Line
 The Zero Years

2006
 10 Items or Less
 12 and Holding
 50 Ways of Saying Fabulous
 The 9/11 Commission Report
 Ad-lib Night
 After the Wedding
 Akeelah and the Bee
 ATL
 Babel
 Barakat!
 Children of Men
 Climates
 Colossal Youth
 Dreamgirls
 Flags of Our Fathers
 Flight 93 - television film
 Half Nelson
 Home of the Brave
 The Illusionist
 Just Like the Son
 Kidulthood
 Letters from Iwo Jima
 Le Lièvre de Vatanen
 Lights in the Dusk
 Little Children
 Little Miss Sunshine
 Maundy Thursday
 Nana 2
 Pan's Labyrinth
 The Pursuit of Happyness
 The Queen
 Traces of Love
 United 93
 We Are Marshall
 The Wind That Shakes the Barley
 World Trade Center

2007
 Alpha Dog
 The Assassination of Jesse James by the Coward Robert Ford
 Atonement
 Black Snake Moan
 Bridge to Terabithia
 Daymaker
 The Diving Bell and the Butterfly (Le Scaphandre et le papillon)
 Ezra Freedom Writers Herb The Invisible Lonely Hearts Miss Potter No Smoking Reign Over Me Spider Lilies'
 Spider-Man 3
 Stomp the Yard
 Team Picture
 There Will Be Blood
 Zodiac

2008
 21
 ATL
 Australia
 BA:BO
 Changeling
 The Curious Case of Benjamin Button
 The Dark Knight
 The Duchess
 Doubt
 Frost/Nixon
 Frozen River
 Gran Torino
 His Last Gift
 Keith
 Milk
 The Reader
 Revolutionary Road
 The Secret Life of Bees
 Seven Pounds
 Sleepwalking
 Slumdog Millionaire
 Sunshine Cleaning
 The Visitor
 The Wrestler

2009
 2012
 Antichrist
 Avatar
 The Blind Side
 Bright Star
 Coco Before Chanel
 Crackie
 Crazy Heart
 Dev.D
 An Education
 Gulaal
 Harry Potter and the Half-Blood Prince
 The Hurt Locker
 Invictus
 The Last Station
 The Lovely Bones
 The Messenger
 Monsters
 Moon
 My Sister's Keeper
 Precious
 A Serious Man
 A Single Man
 Up
 Up in the Air
 White Material
 The Young Victoria

References

Drama
2000s